OK India is an Indian satellite Hindi language television news channel, owned by Dr. Jogender Singh. It was launched on 15 April 2016. The channel broadcasts live from Rohtak, Haryana.

History 
OK India telecast daily three-times news bulletin and especially one-hour broadcast Uttar Pradesh state news. The news channel first broadcast on Tata Sky.

Programs 
Some of the popular programs on OK India news channel.

 Morning top 100
 1 P.M UP fresh news
 Bollywood Masala 
 Evening fast news
Prime Time Debate (Mudde Ki Baat) 8Pm
Desh Ki Baat 9Pm Daily

The channel also broadcast entertainment news, agriculture and mainly telecast Haryana state news.

See also 

 Awaaz India TV
 Lord Buddha TV
 Jan TV
 List of Hindi-language television channels
 Lists of television channels in India

References

External links 

Hindi-language television stations
Hindi-language television channels in India